Yeniköy is a village in the Bigadiç district of Balıkesir province in Turkey.

References

Villages in Bigadiç District